Armin Garnreiter (born 24 July 1958) is a German archer. He competed in the men's individual event at the 1984 Summer Olympics.

References

1958 births
Living people
German male archers
Olympic archers of West Germany
Archers at the 1984 Summer Olympics